John A. Green (September 1894 – 1966) was an English professional football inside right who played in the Football League for Wolverhampton Wanderers.

References 

1894 births
1966 deaths
English footballers
English Football League players
Brentford F.C. wartime guest players
Wolverhampton Wanderers F.C. players
Association football inside forwards